Alisa Yuzy Khaleyeva (born September 26, 1978) is an Azerbaijani former swimmer, who specialized in sprint freestyle events. Khaleyeva competed for Azerbaijan in the women's 50 m freestyle at the 2000 Summer Olympics in Sydney. She received a ticket from FINA, under a Universality program, in an entry time of 28.00. She challenged seven other swimmers in heat three, including Nigeria's top favorite Ngozi Monu and Aruba's 15-year-old teen Roshendra Vrolijk. Entering the race with a fastest-seeded time, Khaleyeva scorched the field effortlessly with a powerful pace, but fell short to third seed in 28.79, almost six-tenths of a second (0.60) behind the leader Monu. Khaleyeva failed to advance into the semifinals, as she placed fifty-ninth overall out of 74 swimmers in the prelims.

References

1978 births
Living people
Azerbaijani female swimmers
Olympic swimmers of Azerbaijan
Swimmers at the 2000 Summer Olympics
Azerbaijani female freestyle swimmers
Sportspeople from Baku
21st-century Azerbaijani women